A flash flood warning (SAME code: FFW) is a severe weather warning product of the National Weather Service that is issued by national weather forecasting agencies throughout the world to alert the public that a flash flood is imminent or occurring in the warned area. A flash flood is a sudden, violent flood after a heavy rain, or occasionally after a dam break. Rainfall intensity and duration, topography, soil conditions, and ground cover contribute to flash flooding.

Most flash floods occur when there is a heavy amount of precipitation falling in an area and that water is then channeled through streams or narrow gullies. Flash floods may take minutes or hours to develop. It is possible to experience a flash flood without witnessing any rain.

Flash flood alerts
There are two types of alerts for flash floods which are issued by the National Weather Service. One is a flash flood watch, which means that conditions are favorable for flash flooding, and the other is a flash flood warning, meaning that a flash flood is occurring or one will occur imminently and is usually issued when there are strong weather radar echoes for an area that is prone to flash flooding.
Flash floods can also occur because of a dam or levee failure, or because of a sudden release of water held by an ice jam.

Residents are usually urged to do the following when flash flooding is imminent:
 Be aware of any signs of heavy rain
 Move to higher ground if rapidly rising water is seen or heard
 Not attempt to cross the flowing water

In addition, some NWS Weather Forecast Offices have instituted an enhanced flash flood warning, referred to as a flash flood emergency (or as termed by the Albany, New York office as a flash flood warning emergency), which indicates a severe flooding situation in densely populated areas, similar to the procedure for declaring a tornado emergency.

On August 27, 2017, as Hurricane Harvey brought torrential rain to southeast Texas, the NWS issued a "Flash Flood Emergency for Catastrophic Life Threatening Flooding."

On September 10, 2017, the NWS issued a Flash Flood Emergency for life-threatening storm surge because of Hurricane Irma in southwestern Florida at the eye landfall.

On February 6, 2020, the NWS issued a Flash Flood Emergency for Tazewell County, Virginia due to a major storm moving through the area which caused the Clinch River to rise to its highest crest in 40 years.

On May 20, 2020, the NWS issued a Flash Flood Emergency for the Tittabawassee River in Midland County, Michigan due to multiple dam failures causing the river to overflow and reach its highest crest since 1986.

On July 6, 2020, the NWS issued a Flash Flood Emergency for Tacony Creek and Frankford Creek, the former situated along Montgomery County and North Philadelphia, Pennsylvania, and the latter along Philadelphia's Frankford neighborhood.

On September 2, 2021, the NWS issued a first ever Flash Flood Emergency for New York City, Philadelphia, Fairfield and New Haven Counties in Connecticut, and most of Central New Jersey a region that stretches over 200 miles, as the remnants of Hurricane Ida transitioned and intensified into a post tropical cyclone causing torrential rains. Some areas reported up to 10 inches of rain in less than an hour. Although the region was forecasted to experience heavy rains, this event is considered unprecedented as such a warning has never been issued to the area. The region had already experienced above average precipitation for most of the Summer due to previous storm systems and tropical storms affecting the area.

Example of a flash flood warning and emergency

Warning

This warning was issued following a dam failure along the Minnesota-Wisconsin border.

Flash Flood Warning
MNC115-WIC013-031-192330-
/O.NEW.KDLH.FF.W.0012.180618T2329Z-180619T2330Z/
/00000.U.DM.000000T0000Z.000000T0000Z.000000T0000Z.OO/

BULLETIN - EAS ACTIVATION REQUESTED
Flash Flood Warning
National Weather Service Duluth MN
1203 PM CDT SUN JUN 18 2018

The National Weather Service in Eastern Duluth MN has issued a

* Flash Flood Warning for...
  A Dam Failure in...
  East central Pine County in east central Minnesota...
  Northwestern Douglas County in northwestern Wisconsin...
  North central Burnett County in northwestern Wisconsin...

* Until 543 PM CDT
* At 1201 PM CDT, local law enforcement reported the Radigan Flowage
  Dam west of Dairyland has failed, causing flash flooding
  downstream on the Tamarack River south of the Dam as it flows
  towards the Saint Croix River.

* Locations impacted include...
  Town Rd T west of Dairyland.
  Swedish Highway at the Tamarack River.
  Highway T west of Cozy Corner.
  Markville Road east of Markville.

PRECAUTIONARY/PREPAREDNESS ACTIONS...

Turn around, don`t drown when encountering flooded roads. Most flood
deaths occur in vehicles.

Move to higher ground now. Act quickly to protect your life.

Please report flooding to your local law enforcement agency when you
can do so safely.

&&

LAT...LON 4623 9218 4616 9226 4611 9228 4607 9229
      4605 9234 4612 9234 4617 9230 4622 9225

$$

LEThis warning was issued for heavy rainfall.PAC051-102345-
/O.NEW.KPBZ.FF.W.0017.200710T2142Z-200710T2345Z/
/00000.0.ER.000000T0000Z.000000T0000Z.000000T0000Z.OO/

BULLETIN - EAS ACTIVATION REQUESTED
Flash Flood Warning
National Weather Service Pittsburgh PA
542 PM EDT Fri Jul 10 2020

The National Weather Service in Northern Pittsburgh has issued a

* Flash Flood Warning for...
  Central Fayette County in southwestern Pennsylvania...

* Until 745 PM EDT.
* At 542 PM EDT, Doppler radar indicated thunderstorms producing
  heavy rain across the warned area. Between 1 and 2.5 inches of
  rain have fallen. Flash flooding is ongoing or expected to begin
  shortly.

  HAZARD...Flash flooding caused by thunderstorms.

  SOURCE...Doppler radar.

  IMPACT...Flooding of small creeks and streams, urban areas,
           highways, streets and underpasses as well as other
           drainage and low lying areas.

* Some locations that will experience flash flooding include...
  Uniontown, South Connellsville, Dunbar, Vanderbilt and Dawson.

Additional rainfall amounts up to 1 inch are possible in the warned
area.

PRECAUTIONARY/PREPAREDNESS ACTIONS...

Turn around, don't drown when encountering flooded roads. Most flood
deaths occur in vehicles.

&&

LAT...LON 4006 7967 3997 7982 3986 7972 3995 7955

FLASH FLOOD...RADAR INDICATED

$$

Emergency

Flash Flood Emergency In Initial Bulletin

Note that this warning contains the enhanced wording Particularly Dangerous Situation.

FLASH FLOOD WARNING
KSC091-209-MOC047-095-270645-
/O.NEW.KEAX.FF.W.0043.160827T0247Z-160827T0645Z/
/00000.0.ER.000000T0000Z.000000T0000Z.000000T0000Z.OO/

BULLETIN - EAS ACTIVATION REQUESTED
FLASH FLOOD WARNING
NATIONAL WEATHER SERVICE KANSAS CITY/PLEASANT HILL MO
947 PM CDT FRI AUG 26 2016

...FLASH FLOOD EMERGENCY FOR THE IMMEDIATE DOWNTOWN KANSAS CITY
AREA!...

THE NATIONAL WEATHER SERVICE IN PLEASANT HILL HAS ISSUED A

* FLASH FLOOD WARNING FOR...
  EASTERN WYANDOTTE COUNTY IN NORTHEASTERN KANSAS...
  NORTHEASTERN JOHNSON COUNTY IN EAST CENTRAL KANSAS...
  NORTHWESTERN JACKSON COUNTY IN WEST CENTRAL MISSOURI...
  SOUTHWESTERN CLAY COUNTY IN WEST CENTRAL MISSOURI...

* UNTIL 145 AM CDT
* AT 943 PM CDT...DOPPLER RADAR INDICATED HEAVY RAIN ACROSS THE
  WARNED AREA. LIFE THREATENING FLASH FLOODING IS ALREADY OCCURRING!

  THIS IS A FLASH FLOOD EMERGENCY FOR THE KANSAS CITY
METRO...PARTICULARLY THE DOWNTOWN KANSAS CITY AREA! THIS IS  A
PARTICULARLY DANGEROUS SITUATION. SEEK HIGHER GROUND NOW!

* SOME LOCATIONS THAT WILL EXPERIENCE FLOODING INCLUDE...
  KANSAS CITY...OVERLAND PARK...INDEPENDENCE...SHAWNEE...LENEXA...
  LEAWOOD...RAYTOWN...LIBERTY...GLADSTONE...PRAIRIE VILLAGE...
  MERRIAM...MISSION...EDWARDSVILLE...NORTH KANSAS CITY...FAIRWAY...
  MISSION HILLS...SUGAR CREEK...RIVERSIDE...WESTWOOD AND CLAYCOMO.

PRECAUTIONARY/PREPAREDNESS ACTIONS...

MOVE TO HIGHER GROUND NOW. THIS IS AN EXTREMELY DANGEROUS AND
LIFE-THREATENING SITUATION. DO NOT ATTEMPT TO TRAVEL UNLESS YOU ARE
FLEEING AN AREA SUBJECT TO FLOODING OR UNDER AN EVACUATION ORDER.

BE ESPECIALLY CAUTIOUS AT NIGHT WHEN IT IS HARDER TO RECOGNIZE THE
DANGERS OF FLOODING.

A FLASH FLOOD WARNING MEANS THAT FLOODING IS IMMINENT OR OCCURRING.
IF YOU ARE IN THE WARNED AREA MOVE TO HIGHER GROUND IMMEDIATELY.
RESIDENTS LIVING ALONG STREAMS AND CREEKS SHOULD TAKE IMMEDIATE
PRECAUTIONS TO PROTECT LIFE AND PROPERTY.

&&

LAT...LON 3917 9466 3915 9466 3916 9460 3919 9460
      3927 9435 3907 9428 3892 9477 3912 9481

$$

GITRO

Flash Flood Emergency In Follow-Up Statement

This particular Flash Flood Emergency also includes the enhanced wording "Particularly Dangerous Situation".

844
WGUS71 KBOX 282143
FFSBOX

Flash Flood Statement
National Weather Service Boston/Norton MA
543 PM EDT Sun Jun 28 2020

MAC005-017-021-023-027-282300-
/O.CON.KBOX.FF.W.0003.000000T0000Z-200628T2300Z/
/00000.0.ER.000000T0000Z.000000T0000Z.000000T0000Z.OO/
Norfolk MA-Worcester MA-Middlesex MA-Plymouth MA-Bristol MA-
543 PM EDT Sun Jun 28 2020

...THIS IS A FLASH FLOOD EMERGENCY FOR THE TOWN OF NORWOOD AND
SURROUNDING TOWNS...

...THE FLASH FLOOD WARNING REMAINS IN EFFECT UNTIL 700 PM EDT FOR
NORFOLK...EASTERN WORCESTER...SOUTH CENTRAL MIDDLESEX...WEST CENTRAL
PLYMOUTH AND NORTH CENTRAL BRISTOL COUNTIES...

At 537 PM EDT, law enforcement reported heavy rain falling including
the towns of Norwood and Dedham where up to 3.5 inches have already
fallen. Flash flooding is already occurring. Some evacuations may be
necessary. Listen to local officials.

THIS IS A FLASH FLOOD EMERGENCY FOR NORWOOD AND SURROUNDING TOWNS!
This is a PARTICULARLY DANGEROUS SITUATION. SEEK HIGHER GROUND NOW!

HAZARD...Life threatening flash flooding. Heavy rain producing flash
         flooding.

SOURCE...Law enforcement.

IMPACT...This is a PARTICULARLY DANGEROUS SITUATION. SEEK HIGHER
         GROUND NOW! Life threatening flash flooding of low water
         crossings, small creeks and streams, urban areas, highways,
         streets and underpasses.

Some locations that will experience flooding include...
Brockton, Quincy, Randolph, Franklin, Norwood, Milford, Milton,
Stoughton, Dedham, Walpole, Mansfield, Easton, Canton, Sharon,
Foxborough, Bellingham, Abington, Westwood, Holliston and Medway.

PRECAUTIONARY/PREPAREDNESS ACTIONS...

Move to higher ground now. This is an extremely dangerous and
life-threatening situation. Do not attempt to travel unless you are
fleeing an area subject to flooding or under an evacuation order.

&&

LAT...LON 4210 7096 4204 7114 4203 7151 4219 7152
      4223 7114 4223 7113 4224 7108

FLASH FLOOD...OBSERVED
FLASH FLOOD DAMAGE THREAT...CATASTROPHIC
EXPECTED RAINFALL...1-2 INCHES IN 1 HOUR

$$

NOCERA

See also

 Flash flood guidance system
 Severe weather terminology (United States)

References

Weather warnings and advisories
Flood control